Alefsaneh (also Romanized as Alefsāneh; also known as Alnesāneh) is a village in Khaveh-ye Jonubi Rural District, in the Central District of Delfan County, Lorestan Province, Iran. At the 2006 census, its population was 632, in 151 families.

References 

Towns and villages in Delfan County